Daping may refer to:

 Daping, Fujian Province, China
 Daping, Hunan Province, China
 Daping, Qingyuan, Guangdong Province, China
 Daping, Mei County, Guangdong Province, China
 Daping, Xingning, Guangdong Province, China
 Daping, Puning, Guangdong Province, China
 Daping Station, Chongqing Municipality, China
Daping - The act of minting a new ApeDad NFT